3540 Protesilaos  is a large Jupiter trojan from the Greek camp, approximately  in diameter. It was discovered on 27 October 1973, by German astronomer Freimut Börngen at the Karl Schwarzschild Observatory in Tautenburg, Germany. The assumed C-type asteroid belongs to the 50 largest Jupiter trojans and has a rotation period of 8.9 hours. It was named after the Greek hero Protesilaus from Greek mythology, the first Greek to set foot on the shores of Troy.

Orbit and classification 

Protesilaos is a dark Jovian asteroid orbiting in the leading Greek camp at Jupiter's  Lagrangian point, 60° ahead of its orbit in a 1:1 resonance (see Trojans in astronomy). It is also a non-family asteroid in the Jovian background population.

It orbits the Sun at a distance of 4.7–5.9 AU once every 12 years and 1 month (4,425 days; semi-major axis of 5.27 AU). Its orbit has an eccentricity of 0.12 and an inclination of 23° with respect to the ecliptic. A first precovery was taken at Palomar Observatory in February 1953, extending the asteroid's observation arc by 20 years prior to its official discovery observation at Tautenburg.

Physical characteristics 

Protesilaos is an assumed, carbonaceous C-type asteroid, which is in line with the body's albedo (see below), while its V–I color index of 0.94 agrees with that of most Jovian D-type asteroids.

Rotation period 

In March 1989 a rotational lightcurve of Protesilaos was obtained from photometric observations by astronomer Stefano Mottola at DLR Institute for Planetary Research. Lightcurve analysis gave a rotation period of 8.945 hours with a brightness amplitude of 0.13 magnitude.

In October 2010, a second photometric measurement over two nights by Robert Stephens at the Goat Mountain Astronomical Research Station  showed a concurring period of  hours with no brightness variation given.

Diameter and albedo 

According to the surveys carried out by the Japanese Akari satellite and the NEOWISE mission of NASA's Wide-field Infrared Survey Explorer, Protesilaos measures 70.22 and 87.66 kilometers in diameter and its surface has an albedo of 0.062. The Collaborative Asteroid Lightcurve Link assumes a standard albedo for a carbonaceous asteroid of 0.057 and calculates a diameter of 76.84 kilometers based on an absolute magnitude of 9.3.

Naming 

This minor planet was named after the hero Protesilaus from Greek mythology. In the Trojan War, he was the first Greek to set foot on the shores of Troy. He was later killed by the Trojan Aeneas, after whom one of the largest Jupiter trojans, 1172 Äneas, is named. Another Jupiter trojan, 13062 Podarkes, is named after his brother Podarkes. The official naming citation was published by the Minor Planet Center on 14 April 1987.

References

External links 
 Asteroid Lightcurve Database (LCDB), query form (info )
 Dictionary of Minor Planet Names, Google books
 Discovery Circumstances: Numbered Minor Planets (1)-(5000) – Minor Planet Center
 
 

003540
Discoveries by Freimut Börngen
Named minor planets
19731027